Biomining is the technique of extracting metals from ores and other solid materials typically using prokaryotes, fungi or plants (phytoextraction also known as phytomining or biomining). These organisms secrete different organic compounds that chelate metals from the environment and bring it back to the cell where they are typically used to coordinate electrons. It was discovered in the mid 1900s that microorganisms use metals in the cell. Some microbes can use stable metals such as iron, copper, zinc, and gold as well as unstable atoms such as uranium and thorium. Large chemostats of microbes can be grown to leach metals from their media. These vats of culture can then be transformed into many marketable metal compounds. Biomining is an environmentally friendly technique compared to typical mining. Mining releases many pollutants while the only chemicals released from biomining is any metabolites or gasses that the bacteria secrete. The same concept can be used for bioremediation models. Bacteria can be inoculated into environments contaminated with metals, oils, or other toxic compounds. The bacteria can clean the environment by absorbing these toxic compounds to create energy in the cell. Bacteria can mine for metals, clean oil spills, purify gold, and use radioactive elements for energy.

History of biomining
The very first recognized biomining system was published in 1951 when Kenneth Temple PhD discovered that Acidithiobacillus ferrooxidans thrives in iron, copper and magnesium rich environments. In Temple's experiment, A. ferrooxidans was inoculated into media containing between 2,000 and 26,000 ppm ferrous iron. He discovered that the bacteria grew faster and were more motile in high iron concentrations. The byproducts of the bacterial growth caused the media to turn very acidic, in which the microorganisms still thrived. Kenneth Temple's experiment proved that microorganisms have mechanisms for sensing and taking up metals for use in the cell. This discovery lead to the development of complex modern biomining systems. Biomining is the use of microorganisms to leach metals from their growth medium. These systems can be used for bioremediation, biohydrometallurgy, or even extracting metals from ores for commercial use. It was later discovered that some fungi also leach metals from their environment. It has been shown that some microorganisms have a mechanism for taking up radioactive metals such as uranium and thorium.

Overview 
The development of industrial mineral processing has been established now in several countries including South Africa, Brazil and Australia. Iron-and sulfur-oxidizing microorganisms are used to release occluded copper, gold and uranium from mineral sulfides. Most industrial plants for biooxidation of gold-bearing concentrates have been operated at 40 °C with mixed cultures of mesophilic bacteria of the genera Acidithiobacillus or Leptospirillum ferrooxidans. In subsequent studies the dissimulatory iron-reducing archaea Pyrococcus furiosus and Pyrobaculum islandicum were shown to reduce gold chloride to insoluble gold.

Using Bacteria such as Acidithiobacillus ferrooxidans to leach copper from mine tailings has improved recovery rates and reduced operating costs. Moreover, it permits extraction from low grade ores – an important consideration in the face of the depletion of high grade ores.

Some examples of past projects in biotechnology include a biologically assisted in situ mining program, biodegradation methods, passive bioremediation of acid rock drainage, and bioleaching of ores and concentrates. This research often results in technology implementation for greater efficiency and productivity or novel solutions to complex problems. Additional capabilities include the bioleaching of metals from sulfide materials, phosphate ore bioprocessing, and the bioconcentration of metals from solutions. One project recently under investigation is the use of biological methods for the reduction of sulfur in coal-cleaning applications.

The potential of thermophilic sulfide-oxidizing archaea in copper extraction has attracted interest due to the efficient extraction of metals from sulfide ores that are recalcitrant to dissolution. Microbial leaching is especially useful for copper ores because copper sulfate, as formed during the oxidation of copper sulfide ores, is very water-soluble. Approximately 25% of all copper mined worldwide is now obtained from leaching processes. The acidophilic archaea Sulfolobus metallicus and Metallosphaera sedula tolerate up to 4% of copper and have been exploited for mineral biomining. Between 40 and 60% copper extraction was achieved in primary reactors and more than 90% extraction in secondary reactors with overall residence times of about 6 days.

The oxidation of the ferrous ion (Fe2+) to the ferric ion (Fe3+) is an energy producing reaction for some microorganisms. As only a small amount of energy is obtained, large amounts of (Fe2+) have to be oxidized. Furthermore, (Fe3+) forms the insoluble  precipitate in H2O. Many Fe2+ oxidizing microorganisms also oxidize sulfur and are thus obligate acidophiles that further acidify the environment by the production of H2SO4. This is due in part to the fact that at neutral pH Fe2+ is rapidly oxidized chemically in contact with the air. In these conditions there is not enough Fe2+ to allow significant growth. At low pH, however, Fe2+ is much more stable. This explains why most of the Fe2+ oxidizing microorganisms are only found in acidic environments and are obligate acidophiles.

The best studied Fe2+ oxidizing bacterium is Acidithiobacillus ferrooxidans, an acidophililic chemolithotroph. The microbiological oxidation of Fe2+ is an important aspect of the development of acidic pHs in mines, and constitutes a serious ecological problem. However, this process can also be usefully exploited when controlled. The sulfur containing ore pyrite (FeS2) is at the start of this process. Pyrite is an insoluble crystalline structure that is abundant in coal- and mineral ores. It is produced by the following reaction:

 S + FeS → FeS2

Normally pyrite is shielded from contact with oxygen and not accessible for microorganisms. Upon exploitation of the mine, however, pyrite is brought into contact with air (oxygen) and microorganisms and oxidation will start. This oxidation relies on a combination of chemically and microbiologically catalyzed processes. Two electron acceptors can influence this process: O2 and Fe3+ ions. The latter will only be present in significant amounts in acidic conditions (pH < 2.5).
First a slow chemical process with O2 as electron acceptor will initiate the oxidation of pyrite:

FeS2 +  O2 + H2O → Fe2+ + 2  + 2 H+

This reaction acidifies the environment and the Fe2+ will be formed is rather stable. In such an environment Acidithiobacillus ferrooxidans will be able to grow rapidly. Upon further acidification Ferroplasma will also develop and further acidify. As a consequence of the microbial activity (energy producing reaction):

Fe2+ → Fe3+

This Fe3+ that remains soluble at low pH reacts spontaneously with the pyrite:

FeS2 + 14 Fe3+ + 8 H2O → 15 Fe2+ + 2  + 16 H+

The produced Fe2+ can again be used by the microorganisms and thus a cascade reaction will be initiated.

Processing methods 

In the industrial microbial leaching process popularly known as bioleaching, low grade ore is dumped in a large pile (the leach dump) and a dilute sulfuric acid solution (pH 2) is percolated down through the pile. The liquid coming out at the bottom of the pile, rich in the mineral is collected and transported to a precipitation plant where the metal is reprecipitated and purified. The liquid is then pumped back to the top of the pile and the cycle is repeated.

Acidithiobacillus ferrooxidans is able to oxidize the Fe2+ in to Fe3+.

Chemical oxidation of the copper ore with ferric (Fe3+) ions formed by the microbial oxidation of ferrous ions (derived from the oxidation of pyrite).
Three possible reactions for the oxidation of copper ore are:

Cu2S +  O2 + 2 H+ → CuS + Cu2+ + H2O
CuS + 2 O2 → Cu2+ + 
CuS + 8 Fe3+ + 4 H2O → Cu2+ + 8 Fe2+ +  + 8 H+

The copper metal is then recovered by using Fe0 from steel cans:

Fe0 + Cu2+ → Cu0 + Fe2+

The temperature inside the leach dump often rises spontaneously as a result of microbial activities. Thus, thermophilic iron-oxidizing chemolithotrophs such as thermophilic Acidithiobacillus species and Leptospirillum and at even higher temperatures the thermoacidophilic archaeon Sulfolobus (Metallosphaera sedula) may become important in the leaching process above 40 °C. Similarly to copper, Acidithiobacillus ferrooxidans can oxidize U4+ to U6+ with O2 as electron acceptor. However, it is likely that the uranium leaching process depends more on the chemical oxidation of uranium by Fe3+, with At. ferrooxidans contributing mainly through the reoxidation of Fe2+ to Fe3+ as described above.

UO2 + Fe(SO4)3 → UO2SO4 + 2 FeSO4

Current techniques 
Gold is frequently found in nature associated with minerals containing arsenic and pyrite. In the microbial leaching process Acidithiobacillus ferrooxidans and relatives are able to attack and make soluble the arsenopyrite minerals, and in the process, releasing the trapped gold (Au):

2 FeAsS[Au] + 7 O2 + 2 H2O + H2SO4 → Fe(SO4)3 + 2 H3AsO4 + [Au]

Biohydrometallurgy is an emerging trend in biomining in which commercial mining plants operate continuously stirred tank reactor (STR) and the airlift reactor (ALR) or pneumatic reactor (PR) of the Pachuca type to extract the low concentration mineral resources efficiently.

The development of industrial mineral processing using microorganisms has been established now in several countries including South Africa, Brazil and Australia. Iron-and sulfur-oxidizing microorganisms are used to release copper, gold and uranium from minerals. Electrons are pulled off of sulfur metal through oxidation and then put onto iron, producing reducing equivalents in the cell in the process. This is shown in this figure. These reducing equivalents then go on to produce adenosine triphosphate in the cell through the electron transport chain. Most industrial plants for biooxidation of gold-bearing concentrates have been operated at 40 °C with mixed cultures of mesophilic bacteria of the genera Acidithiobacillus or Leptospirillum ferrooxidans. In other studies the iron-reducing archaea Pyrococcus furiosus were shown to produce hydrogen gas which can then be used as fuel. Using Bacteria such as Acidithiobacillus ferrooxidans to leach copper from mine tailings has improved recovery rates and reduced operating costs. Moreover, it permits extraction from low grade ores - an important consideration in the face of the depletion of high grade ores.

The acidophilic archaea Sulfolobus metallicus and Metallosphaera sedula can tolerate up to 4% of copper and have been exploited for mineral biomining. Between 40 and 60% copper extraction was achieved in primary reactors and more than 90% extraction in secondary reactors with overall residence times of about 6 days. All of these microbes are gaining energy by oxidizing these metals. Oxidation means increasing the number of bonds between an atom to oxygen. Microbes will oxidize sulfur. The resulting electrons will reduce iron, releasing energy that can be used by the cell.

Bioremediation
Bioremediation is the process of using microbial systems to restore the environment to a healthy state. Certain microorganisms can survive in metal rich environments where they can then leach metallic cations for use in the cell. These microbes can be used to remove metals from the soil or water. These metal extractions can be performed in situ or ex situ where in situ is preferred since it is less expensive to excavate the substrate.

Bioremediation is not specific to metals. In 2010 there was a massive oil spill in the Gulf of Mexico. Populations of bacteria and archaea were used to rejuvenate the coast after the oil spill. These microorganisms over time have developed metabolic networks that can utilize hydrocarbons such as oil and petroleum as a source of carbon and energy. Microbial bioremediation is a very effective modern technique for restoring natural systems by removing toxins from the environment.

Future prospects
The potential applications of biomining are countless. Some past projects include in situ mining, biodegradation, bioremediation, and bioleaching of ores. Biomining research typically leads to new technology implementation for higher metal yields. Biomining provides a novel solution to complex environmental issues. Additional capabilities include the bioleaching of metals from sulfide ores, phosphate ores, and concentrating of metals from solution. One project recently under investigation is the use of biological methods for the reduction of sulfur in coal-cleaning applications. From in situ mining to mineral processing and treatment technology, biomining provides innovative and cost-effective industrial solutions. It may be useful for extracting useful metals in space.

See also 
 Phytoextraction

References

External links 
 "NBIAP News Report." U.S. Department of Agriculture (June 1994).

Mining techniques